Severe Tropical Storm Jebi, known in the Philippines as Tropical Storm Jolina, was a tropical cyclone that caused loss of life and moderate damage across Vietnam and South China in July 2013. At least six people were killed in Vietnam. The most extensive losses took place in Quảng Ninh Province where 320 homes and 200 hectares of crops were damaged. In China, losses were listed at CNY490 million (US$80.3 million).

Meteorological history

During the next three days, the low pressure area crossed the Philippines and arrived on the West Philippine Sea on July 30, located west of Batangas.

After favorable conditions, both PAGASA and JMA upgraded the system into a tropical depression and was named Jolina. On July 31, the JMA upgraded the system into a tropical storm and was given the international name Jebi.

Impact

Philippines

China
Approximately 1,000 homes were damaged and economic losses were listed at CNY490 million (US$79.9 million).

Vietnam
Jebi made landfall in Quang Ninh on August 3 morning at 03.00 UTC. In Vietnam, more than 1,000 homes and other structures were damaged in multiple northern provinces. At least seven people were killed and 11 others were injured. Total economic losses were estimated at approximately VND75.89 billion (US$3.3 million).

Located at the edge of the storm, Hanoi has had little rain last night. To 10 rain to cover the entire province (concentration about 30 minutes). The moment happened flooding rain in some locations, such as: Pham Van Dong (areas without sewer system), down 5 Phung Hung - Duong Thanh, Doi, Lieu Giai, Huynh Thuc Khang, Nguyen Promotion receded ... and after 15 minutes.

See also

Typhoon Kai-tak (2012)
Typhoon Kalmaegi (2014)

References

External links

JMA General Information of Severe Tropical Storm Jebi (1309) from Digital Typhoon
JMA Best Track Data of Severe Tropical Storm Jebi (1309) 
JTWC Best Track Data of Tropical Storm 09W (Jebi)
09W.JEBI from the U.S. Naval Research Laboratory

2013 Pacific typhoon season
2013 in Vietnam
Typhoons in Vietnam
2013 disasters in the Philippines
Typhoons in the Philippines
2013 disasters in China
Typhoons in China
Western Pacific severe tropical storms
Jebi